Crannogue is a townland in County Tyrone, Northern Ireland. It is situated in the historic barony of Dungannon Middle and the civil parish of Pomeroy and covers an area of 759 acres.

The population of the townland increased slightly during the 19th century:

The townland contains one Scheduled Historic Monument: a Fortified mound (grid ref:  H6839 6762).

See also
List of townlands of County Tyrone
List of archaeological sites in County Tyrone

References

Townlands of County Tyrone
Archaeological sites in County Tyrone
Barony of Dungannon Middle